Tokwa't baboy (Tagalog for "tofu and pork") is a typical Philippine appetizer. It consists of pork ears, pork belly and deep-fried tofu, and is served in a mixture of soy sauce, pork broth, vinegar, chopped white onions, scallions and red chili peppers. It is usually served as pulutan ("snack", lit. tran: "finger food"), as a meal served with rice or as a side dish to rice porridge. Tokwa is the Lan-nang word for firm beancurd, while baboy is the Tagalog word for pork; t is the contracted form of at, which means "and".

The original dish (without the tofu) is known as kulao''' or kilawin na tainga ng baboy among the Caviteño Tagalogs. It is a type of kinilaw. For this reason, tokwa't baboy is sometimes referred to as kilawing tokwa't baboy''.

See also
 List of hors d'oeuvre
 List of pork dishes
 List of tofu dishes
Philippine Cuisine

References

Appetizers
Tofu dishes
Offal
Philippine pork dishes